Cumming is a surname.

People bearing the surname include:

 Alan Cumming (born 1965), Scottish actor
 Alexander Cumming (1733–1814), Scottish watchmaker and inventor
 Alexander Charles Cumming (1880-1940), Australian-born chemist and author
 Alfred Cumming (governor) (1802), Governor of the U.S. Territory of Utah from 1858 to 1861
 Alfred Cumming (general) (1829–1910), Confederate General in American Civil War (nephew of previous Alfred Cumming)
 Arthur Cumming (skater) (1889–1914), British figure skater
 Arthur Cumming (Royal Navy officer) (1817–1893), Admiral of the Royal Navy
 Arthur Edward Cumming (1896–1971), British Army officer and Victoria Cross recipient
 Bobby Cumming, Scottish footballer
 Charles Cumming (born 1971), Scottish writer of spy fiction
 Charlotte Gordon Cumming (born 1958) a Scottish singer/songwriter
 Craig Cumming (born 1975), New Zealand cricketer
 Dave Cumming (1891–1918), Australian rules footballer and soldier
 David Cumming (1910–1993), Scottish footballer
 David Robert Sime Cumming, Scottish engineer
 Donigan Cumming (born 1947), visual artist
 George Cumming (politician) (1752–1834), Scottish politician, MP for Inverness Burghs 1803–06 and 1818–26
 George Cumming (golfer) (1879–1950), Canadian professional golfer and golf course architect 
 Hanway Robert Cumming (1867-1921), British Army general killed by the IRA in the Clonbanin ambush
 Henry John Cumming (1771–1856), British Army officer
 Henry Harford Cumming, important figure in antebellum Augusta, Georgia
 Hugh S. Cumming (1868–1948), Surgeon General of the United States
 John Cumming (clergyman) (1807–1881), Scottish clergyman
 John Cumming (Scottish footballer) (1930–2008), Scottish footballer
 Joseph Cumming, Scholar of Islamic and Christian thought
 Joseph George Cumming (1812–1868), English geologist and archaeologist
 Kenneth Cumming (1916–1988), Western Australian cricketer
 Peter Hood Ballantine Cumming, mayor of Rumson, New Jersey
 Primrose Cumming, writer
 Robert H. Cumming (born 1943), American artist and photographer
 Thomas W. Cumming, U.S. Representative from New York
 William Cumming (delegate) (1724–1797), American lawyer, Continental Congressman for North Carolina
 William Cumming (colonel) (1788–1863), American soldier and planter from Augusta, Georgia

See also
 Gordon-Cumming, a list of people with the surname
 Charles Cumming-Bruce (1790–1875), Scottish Conservative politician
 John Graham-Cumming, British computer programmer
 Mansfield Smith-Cumming (1859–1923), British spymaster
 Clan Cumming
 Cummings (surname)